William Prince (1772 – September 8, 1824) was a U.S. Representative from Indiana.

Born in Ireland in 1772, Prince immigrated to the United States in 1796 and settled in Indiana.
He studied law.
He served as Commissioner for Gibson County, Indiana, and drew the winning lot to become the county seat's namesake in 1814.
Prince served in the Indiana Territorial Council. He then served as territorial auditor.
He served in the State senate in 1816. Prince also served as state circuit judge.
He served as delegate to the State constitutional convention in 1816.
He served as captain in the Battle of Tippecanoe.
He served as member of the State house of representatives in 1821 and 1822.
He was elected as a Democratic-Republican to the Eighteenth Congress and served from March 4, 1823, until his death near Princeton, Indiana, September 8, 1824.
He was interred in the Old Cemetery, near Princeton.

Princeton, Indiana is named for him.

See also
List of United States Congress members who died in office (1790–1899)

References

1772 births
1824 deaths
Indiana Territory officials
Members of the Indiana Territorial Legislature
19th-century American politicians
Indiana state court judges
Indiana state senators
Members of the Indiana House of Representatives
Members of the United States House of Representatives from Indiana
Indiana Democratic-Republicans
People from Indiana in the War of 1812
Democratic-Republican Party members of the United States House of Representatives
People from Princeton, Indiana